Silvia Ramón-Cortés Montaner (born 9 August 1972) is a former professional tennis player from Spain.

Biography
A right-handed player from Barcelona, Ramón-Cortés represented the Spanish national team as a junior and was runner-up to countrywoman Pilar Pérez in the 1990 Orange Bowl.

Ramón-Cortés reached a highest singles ranking of 125 on the professional tour. Her biggest title win was a $25k tournament in Vigo in 1994. On the WTA Tour, she was a quarterfinalist at the 1995 Styrian Open and also made the round of 16 that year at Amelia Island, beating world No. 39, Miriam Oremans en route.

She retired from pro circuit in 1996 and now works as a communications consultant.

ITF Circuit finals

Singles: 3 (3–0)

Doubles: 10 (3–7)

References

External links
 
 

1972 births
Living people
Spanish female tennis players
Tennis players from Barcelona